A Brilliant Mistake  is a full-length album by American alternative rock band Tsunami, released in 1997. It was the band's last album.

Production
The album was recorded in Chicago.  Members of The Sea and Cake, the Coctails, and the Pulsars contributed instrumentation to the album.

Critical reception
The Washington Post wrote that "Tsunami still doesn't compose outgoing melodies, but the band's control of mood and texture has become formidable." CMJ New Music Monthly called the album "heady and beautiful," and praised Jenny Toomey's "rich, liquid voice." Nashville Scene called the album the band's best, writing that "the instrumentation on A Brilliant Mistake is a remarkable achievement—an absorption of some of the prettier sounds of the 'post-rock' movement while retaining a fundamentally aggro-punk edge." The Courier-Journal wrote that "Tsunami hasn't forgotten how to write challenging pop songs, and Toomey's voice remains one of indie rock's most beautiful instruments."

Track listing

 "Old Grey Mare"
 "Great Mimes"
 "Double Shift"
 "Enter Misguided"
 "The Workers Are Punished"
 "Liar's Dice (Flight of the Chickens)"
 "The Match"
 "Poodle"
 "Unbridled"
 "DMFH"
 "David Foster Wallace"
 "Hockey"
 "PBS"

References

Tsunami (band) albums
1997 albums